Reveal is a nationally broadcast public radio show and investigative reporting podcast hosted by Al Letson. The radio program is released on Saturdays on radio stations in the Public Radio Exchange network and the show is also available in podcast form. It is part of a growing trend of investigative reporting being disseminated through audio. Its first weekly season was ranked among the top 50 podcasts by The Atlantic.

Reveal has experimented with new modes of distribution, including using SMS to provide interactivity to its podcasts. The main website for Reveal contains links to each podcast episode, video, and multimedia story shared by the outlet. Each video is also available on their YouTube channel. The outlet also has a blog where the staff posts about internal updates and how they created data-driven stories.

Reveal showcases the work of CIR and other large and small newsrooms in the US. The show sued the Trump Administration under the Freedom of Information Act for access to records related to the cost of the border wall the administration is pursuing. Its reporting resulted in the shut down of unlicensed work camps being used as drug treatment facilities.

All of the CIR's digital reporting is available on Reveals website where the CIR shares podcasts, videos, and many data-driven investigative projects. Reveals CEO is Christa Scharfenberg.

Reveals investigation into racial disparities in mortgage lending in 2018 was mentioned on the floor of the Senate by Senator Elizabeth Warren and was the subject of a lengthy op-ed in The New York Times.

In 2017, host Al Letson was photographed physically intervening to protect a right-wing protester at a rally that turned violent in Berkeley, California.

Reception and awards
In 2013, the show received a Peabody Award for its first radio episode, "Reveal: The VA's Opiate Overload (Public Radio)".

Reveal won the 2017 Edward Murrow Award from the Overseas Press Club for best News Documentary for "Dropped and Dismissed: Child Sex Abuse Lost in the System" as well as Best Sports Reporting for "Making the Team". The episode "Voting rights – and wrongs" earned a podcast Webby Award in 2017 for News & Information. In 2016, it won the Edward R. Murrow Award for Overall Excellence for a small online news organization.

Two episodes from 2018, "Monumental Lies" and "Kept Out", each won Peabody Awards, and the radio show itself won the Alfred I. duPont–Columbia University Award in 2018.

Episodes 
Reveal releases new episodes weekly on Saturdays. , the show has released 269 episodes.

References

External links
 

2013 podcast debuts
Audio podcasts
Investigative journalism
Political podcasts 
News podcasts 
American podcasts